Mako: The Jaws of Death is a 1976 thriller film directed by William Grefe. The film is about a brooding loner who accidentally learns that he has a telepathic and emotional connection with sharks. He eventually rebukes society and sets out to protect sharks from people. The film was set and shot on location in Key West, Florida. This film is one of the first in the wave of films that sought to capitalize on the popularity of the feature film, Jaws (1975). Mako: The Jaws of Death, with its sympathetic portrayal of sharks as the real "victims" of human exploitation, is notable in the maritime horror genre for having depicted the sharks as the heroes and man as the villain.

Plot
Sonny Stein (Richard Jaeckel), learns while working as a marine salvager in the Philippine Islands, that he has a connection with mako sharks. He is given a medallion by a Filipino shaman that protects him from sharks when he is among them. Having become alienated from society, Stein lives alone in a small stilt house offshore of Key West, Florida. He develops an ability to telepathically communicate with sharks. He then sets out to destroy anybody who harms sharks. People enter into his strange world to exploit his abilities and his closeness with his shark "friends". They include an unethical shark research scientist and a morbidly obese strip club owner (Buffy Dee) who wants to use a shark in his dancers' acts. Stein uses the sharks to get revenge on anybody he considers a threat. He later loses the medallion and is then himself killed by the sharks.

Cast

External links 
 
 

1976 films
1976 horror films
1970s horror thriller films
1970s science fiction horror films
American horror thriller films
American natural horror films
American science fiction horror films
Films about sharks
Films shot in Florida
Films about shark attacks
Golan-Globus films
Films directed by William Grefe
1970s English-language films
1970s American films